The Hobo's Last Ride is an album of American musicians Norman Blake and Nancy Blake, released in 1996.

Track listing 
 "The Democratic Donkey (Is in His Stall Again)" – 3:30
 "Tell Mother I'll Meet Her" – 3:32
 "Forked Deer" – 3:21
 "The Hobo's Last Ride" – 4:23
 "Thebes" – 6:27
 "Leaving Home" – 4:14
 "Home of the Soul" – 3:04
 "Midnight, the Unconquered Outlaw" – 4:32
 "The Old Grey Mare Came Tearin' Out of the Wilderness" – 3:09
 "I Know My Name Is There" – 3:56
 "Starving to Death on the Government Claim" – 4:47
 "Old Shady Bothreen" – 3:15
 "Tying a Knot in the Devil's Tail" – 4:17
 "Angel Gabriel" – 4:42
 "The Two Little Orphans" – 4:11
 "Memories That Never Die" – 4:26

Personnel
Norman Blake – guitar, mandolin, banjo, fiddle, viola, vocals
Nancy Blake – guitar, mandolin, cello, vocals

References

1996 albums
Norman Blake (American musician) albums